The Independence Stadium in Windhoek's Olympia suburb is the national stadium of the Republic of Namibia. Owned by the Government of Namibia it holds 25,000 spectators and is mainly used for association football events.

, the stadium has been described as "dilapidated". The Confederation of African Football (CAF) has decommissioned the stadium in 2021 for it being sub-standard. No other Namibian stadium meets CAF's requirements. As a result, international games of the Namibia national football team will have to be played abroad.

See also
Sam Nujoma Stadium, the other large football stadium in Windhoek

References

Football venues in Namibia
Athletics (track and field) venues in Namibia
Buildings and structures in Windhoek
Namibia
Sport in Windhoek